Ebola is the Ebola virus disease of humans and other primates caused by ebolaviruses.

Ebola may also refer to:
 Ebola virus, a virus within the genus Ebolavirus and the cause of the majority of human deaths from Ebola virus disease
 Ebola River, a river in the Democratic Republic of the Congo
 Ebola (band), a Thai rock band

See also
 Eboladrome, a test track used by The Grand Tour
 Ebolavirus, a genus of viruses (with five known species)
 Eboli, a town in Italy
 List of Ebola outbreaks
 West African Ebola virus epidemic, an outbreak that lasted between 2013 and 2016.